Rocío del Pilar Restrepo Lugo (born November 21, 1987) is a Colombian ten-pin bowler who now resides in the United States. She bowls professionally on the Professional Women's Bowling Association (PWBA) Tour, and also internationally as a member of Team Colombia.

Background
Restrepo graduated from Wichita State University in 2010 with a degree in Communications and Broadcast Journalism.

Amateur bowling career
At age 15, Restrepo was the youngest bowler to win a medal at the World Championships, receiving a silver medal at the 2003 WTBA World Tenpin Bowling Championship in Kuala Lumpur.

A member of the Colombian national youth team (2002-2008) and Colombian national team (since 2003), Restrepo was a five-time Colombian national champion.

Restrepo bowled at Wichita State University, and was a member of their 2007 and 2009 championship teams at the Intercollegiate Team Championships. She was the 2013 USBC Women's Championships all-events champion and the 2016 USBC Women's Championships Diamond Team champion.

In addition to participating in team wins at various PABCON and WTBA events, Restrepo won the individual gold medal in the Women's Masters division at the 2016 Pan American Bowling Confederation (PABCON) Champion of Champions tournament in Puebla, Mexico.

In 2017, Restrepo won the gold medal in the team competition at The World Games 2017 in Wrocław, Poland.

Professional bowling career
Restrepo has bowled on the PWBA Tour since its rebirth in 2015. She currently owns four PWBA Tour titles, including two victories in the 2016 season.

PWBA Tour wins
2016 PWBA Greater Detroit Open (Canton, Michigan)
2016 PWBA St. Petersburg-Clearwater Open (Seminole, Florida)
2017 QubicaAMF PWBA Sonoma County Open (Rohnert Park, California)
2018 BowlerX.com PWBA Twin Cities Open (Eagan, Minnesota)

References 

Colombian ten-pin bowling players
1987 births
Living people
Bowlers at the 2015 Pan American Games
Pan American Games medalists in bowling
Pan American Games gold medalists for Colombia
Pan American Games bronze medalists for Colombia
World Games gold medalists
Competitors at the 2017 World Games
World Games medalists in bowling
Medalists at the 2015 Pan American Games
20th-century Colombian women
21st-century Colombian women